Caguas Sporting FC is an association football team that plays in Caguas.  They currently play in the Liga Puerto Rico.

This team is from Caguas, Puerto Rico.

History

On March 12, 2017 the team announced the inauguration of their new updated playing field for the coming season, "el parque del Sector La Macanea". The field is to be co-hosted with Los Santos FC due to an alliance Caguas Sporting FC to establish a soccer based program from baby soccer to the senior team with a philosophy of play and training designed to develop high level players.

Copa de Excellencia III 
Caguas Sporting started off the Puerto Rico Soccer League in the third Cup of Excellence playing their first match against GPS Puerto Rico, losing 2–4. Olvin Ortiz scored two in the game.

Current squad

Club hierarchy

General Manager:

President : Lisa Collazo  

Vice President :

Technical Director  :  Jorge Oscar Rosa

Year-by-year

Achievements

Puerto Rico Soccer League: 0
Runners-up (0):

References

External links 
https://www.ligapuertorico.com/clubes.php?club=102#
https://el.soccerway.com/teams/puerto-rico/caguas-sporting/41053/

Liga Nacional de Fútbol de Puerto Rico teams
Sports in Mayagüez, Puerto Rico
Football clubs in Puerto Rico
Puerto Rico Soccer League teams
2016 establishments in Puerto Rico